A conveyor pulley is a mechanical device used to change the direction of the belt in a conveyor system, to drive the belt, and to tension the belt.  Modern pulleys are made of rolled shells with flexible end disks and locking assemblies.  Early pulley engineering was developed by Josef Sitzwohl  in Australia in 1948 and later by Helmuth Lange  and Walter Schmoltzi in Germany.

Components

Pulleys are made up of several components including the shell, end disk, hub, shaft and locking assembly. The end disk and hub may be one piece. The locking assembly may also be replaced with a hub and bushing on lower tension pulleys. The shell is also referred to as the rim in some parts of the world.

The pulley shaft is typically sized following CEMA B105.1 in the Americas or AS 1403 in Australia.

Design programs
 Pulley Maven, software for designing and analyzing conveyor pulleys
 Conveyor Soft, pulley design program
 Helix delta-d Conveyor Pulley to AS1403 Software

Historic manufacturers

Pulley manufacturers in East Germany (DDR) in 1962 included Zemag, Lauchhammer, and Köthen.

References

Simple machines
Mechanical power transmission
Belt drives
Bulk material handling
Material-handling equipment